Jean-François Dellac (born May 1, 1961 in Toulouse) is a French sport shooter. He competed at the 2000 Summer Olympics in the men's skeet event, in which he tied for 35th place.

References

1961 births
Living people
Skeet shooters
French male sport shooters
Shooters at the 2000 Summer Olympics
Olympic shooters of France